The China Center for International Economic Exchanges (CCIEE) is a think tank based in Beijing, China. The CCIEE is an international economic research, exchange, and consulting service organization approved by the government of the People's Republic of China. It is a comprehensive organization that concentrates high-end talents in the field of economic research and extensively contacts various economic research forces. Founded in 2009, its self-described mission is "promoting international economic research and exchanges and providing consulting service." The establishment of CCIEE has been characterized as a demonstration of what some scholars had previously described as an emerging effort by Chinese policy leaders to create mechanisms to "facilitate broad domestic and international policy discussions" combining the expertise of political officials, business leaders, and academics returning from overseas study.

The CCIEE has been described as "China's top think tank." Though funded by both government and private sources, the CCIEE has been noted for its tight connections to the government of the People's Republic of China. Underscoring this relationship, its offices are located a few hundred meters from Zhongnanhai.

References

External links

Organizations established in 2009
Organizations based in Beijing
2009 establishments in China
Foreign policy and strategy think tanks in China
Political and economic think tanks based in China